Leucochrysini is a tribe of green lacewings in the family Chrysopidae. There are 7 genera and 213 described species in Leucochrysini.

Genera
These seven genera belong to the tribe Leucochrysini:
 Berchmansus Navás, 1913 i c g — 2 species
 Cacarulla Navás, 1910 i c g — 1 species
 Gonzaga Navás, 1913 i c g — 8 species
 Leucochrysa McLachlan, 1868 i c g b — 196 species
 Neula Navás, 1917 i c g — 1 species
 Nuvol Navás, 1916 i c g — 1 species
 Santocellus C. Tauber and Albuquerque in C. Tauber et al., 2008 i c g — 4 species
Data sources: i = ITIS, c = Catalogue of Life, g = GBIF, b = Bugguide.net

References

Further reading

External links

Chrysopidae
Articles created by Qbugbot